Tactics and Air Combat Development Establishment or TACDE is an Indian Air Force unit for training aerial combat to its top one percent fighter pilots. TACDE is based in Gwalior, Madhya Pradesh. It was conferred Presidential standard in 2009. The institution evolves tactical procedures for various aircraft, implements standard operating procedures and trains pilots in operational doctrines.

History
TACDE was founded by Wing Commander A. K. Mukherjee alongside Squadron Leader R S Chib,VSM. It was established in 1971 from previously formed Tactics and Combat Development and Training Squadron at Adampur, Punjab. It got re-designated as TACDE in December 1972. The institution has numerous awards and honors including Vir Chakra and Kirti Chakra. TACDE was awarded ‘Battle Honours’ by the President of India in 1995 for its role in the Indo-Pak conflict of 1971.

TACDE fighters collision on 28 January 2023

On the morning of 28 January 2023, three TACDE pilots, including a Mirage 2000H instructor pilot, were involved in a mid-air collision involving a TACDE dual-seat Su-30MKI and a TACDE single-seat Mirage 2000H. The Mirage-2000H pilot, Wing Commander Hanumanth Rao Sarathi, was unable to eject and died in the accident, whilst the two other pilots, flying the Su-30MKI, ejected and were hospitalized with minor injuries. Both fighter jets had taken off from Gwalior for a training mission.

Inventory
Mirage 2000
Sukhoi Su-30MKI
Mikoyan MiG-29

Notable alumni
Pradeep Vasant Naik
Anil Yashwant Tipnis
Srinivasapuram Krishnaswamy

See also
 College of Air Warfare
 Combat Commanders' School (Pakistan)
 Indian National Defence University
 Military Academies in India
 Sainik School
 United States Navy Strike Fighter Tactics Instructor program
 Vijeta- 1982 Bollywood movie

References

Military units and formations of the Indian Air Force
Military education and training in India
1971 establishments in India
Educational institutions established in 1971